Microdes arcuata is a moth in the family Geometridae first described by Charles Swinhoe in 1902. It is found in Australia (including South Australia, the type location).

References

Moths described in 1902
Eupitheciini